Bayhead may refer to:
Bayhead, a swamp habitat
Bayhead, Nova Scotia, a community in Canada

See also
Bay Head, New Jersey, a borough in the United States